Saint-Vincent Cemetery is a cemetery in the 18th arrondissement of Paris.

History
Saint-Vincent Cemetery was opened on January 5, 1831. It was Montmartres second cemetery, built after the Cimetière du Calvaire had been filled.

Notable interments
 Marcel Aymé (1902–1967), writer
 Harry Baur (1880–1943), actor
 Eugène Boudin (1824–1898) painter
 Marcel Carné (1906–1996), film director
 Jules Chéret (1836–1932), master poster designer

 Jean-François Delmas (1861–1933), opera singer
 Suzanne Grandais (1893–1920), actress
 Roland Dorgelès (1885–1973), writer
 Arthur Honegger (1892–1955), composer
 Désiré-Émile Inghelbrecht (1880–1965), composer and orchestra leader
 Gen Paul (1895–1975), painter
 Claude Pinoteau (1925–2012), screenwriter and producer
 Paul Sédir (Yvon Le Loup), (1871–1926), writer, philosopher
 Théophile Steinlen (1859–1923) painter
 Maurice Utrillo (1883–1955), painter
 Andrée Vaurabourg (1894–1980), French pianist and teacher

Location
Saint-Vincent Cemetery is located in rue Lucien-Gaulard in the Montmartre Quarter of Paris, France. It is a short walk from the Montmartre Cemetery and near the Sacré-Cœur. The Lapin Agile is located behind the wall, behind the grave of Maurice Utrillo.

 The cemetery is a short walk from the Lamarck – Caulaincourt métro station and is serviced by line 12.
The nearest railway stations are Gare du Nord and Gare de Pont-Cardinet.
 The cemetery is also served by bus line 80. There is a Vélib' station at Rue du Coulaincourt (18017).

Gallery

External links

 
  Saint-Vincent Cemetery on the Mairie de Paris website (including map)
  Landru, Philippe, Cimetière Saint-Vincent de Montmartre, Cimetières de France et d'ailleurs 2009
  Saint-Vincent Cemetery on the APPL website

Cemeteries in Paris
Buildings and structures in the 18th arrondissement of Paris
Montmartre